The first Auckland Anniversary Regatta took place in 1840 and has grown to become one of the largest single day regattas and is the oldest sporting event in New Zealand.  The number of boats entered in 2008 was 400 which when compared to the Sydney Australia Day Regatta entry of 120 gives an indication of the magnitude of this event.  The size is particularly interesting when traditionally the prizes have just been the honour of winning.  As a yachting event it pre-dates the more prestigious America's Cup by 11 years.

References

External links
NZ Herald Auckland Anniversary Regatta

1840 establishments in New Zealand
Annual sporting events in New Zealand
Sailing competitions in New Zealand
Single day sailing competitions
Sport in Auckland
Recurring sporting events established in 1840
Sports competitions in Auckland
Waitematā Harbour